Kadethan railway station is a small railway station in Pune district, Maharashtra. Its code is KDTN. It serves Kadethan village. The station consists of two platforms.

References 

Railway stations in Pune district
Pune railway division